71 Fragments of a Chronology of Chance is a 1994 Austrian drama film directed by Michael Haneke. It has a fragmented storyline as the title suggests, and chronicles several seemingly unrelated stories in parallel, but these separate narrative lines intersect in an incident at the end of the film. The film is set in Vienna from October to December 1993. Haneke refers to 71 Fragments of a Chronology of Chance as the last part of his "glaciation trilogy", the other parts of which are his preceding two films The Seventh Continent and Benny's Video.

Plot
The film opens with intertitles which introduce the mass killing in detail. It then chronicles in flashbacks the previous few months of several people in Vienna. A young Romanian boy sneaks across the border at night, wading through a swamp and hiding in the back of a truck. In Vienna he lives on the streets as a beggar. A security worker makes pickups at a bank. At home he argues with his wife and says prayers at great length. A young man steals weapons from a military armory. A college student plays games with his friends in which they bet against each other. He bets his watch against a stolen pistol. A retired man sits at home watching TV, talking at great length to his daughter who is too busy to spend time with him. A married couple tries to adopt a young girl.

The Romanian boy is picked up by authorities and his story receives news coverage. He is taken in by the couple who wanted to adopt the girl. While out doing errands, the wife leaves him in the car while she goes inside the bank. At the same time, the retired man goes to the bank under the guise of picking up his pension, but he's really there to see his daughter who works there.

The college student stops for gas. Short on cash, he goes across the street to use the ATM, but it is out of order. Stressed out and in a rush, he goes inside the crowded bank and attempts to cut to the front of the line, but he is assaulted by another customer. He leaves the bank and walks back to his car where he retrieves his gun. He returns to the bank, where he begins firing indiscriminately at the people inside. He then walks back to his car and shoots himself.

Characters
The drama consists of varied characters in each storyline: a Romanian boy who immigrated illegally into Austria and lives on the streets of Vienna; a religious bank security worker; a lonely old man staring at a TV screen; a childless couple considering adoption; a frustrated student and so on.

Film division
The film is divided into a number of variable-length "fragments" separated by black pauses and apparently unrelated to each other. The film is characterized by several fragments that take the form of video newscasts unrelated to the main storylines. News footages of real events are shown through video monitors. Newscasts report on the Bosnian War, the Somali Civil War, the South Lebanon conflict, the Kurdish–Turkish conflict, and molestation allegations against Michael Jackson.

Cast
 Gabriel Cosmin Urdes as Marian Radu (Romanian Boy)
 Lukas Miko as Max
 Otto Grünmandl as Tomek
 Anne Bennent as Inge Brunner
 Udo Samel as Paul Brunner
 Branko Samarovski as Hans
 Claudia Martini as Maria
 Georg Friedrich as Bernie
 Alexander Pschill as Hanno
 Klaus Händl as Gerhard
 Corina Eder as Anni
 Sebastian Stan as Kid in Subway

References

External links
 
 

1994 films
1994 drama films
Austrian drama films
1990s German-language films
1990s Romanian-language films
Films directed by Michael Haneke
Austrian multilingual films
1994 multilingual films